Arochoides is a genus of spiders in the family Mimetidae. It was first described in 1935 by Mello-Leitão. , it contains only one species, Arochoides integrans, found in Brazil.

References

Mimetidae
Monotypic Araneomorphae genera
Spiders of Brazil